Chondrolysis [ICD Code ] is the process of breakdown of cartilage. It can occur as a result of trauma (traumatic chondrolysis). Intra-articular infusions of certain local anesthetic agents such as bupivacaine, lidocaine, ropivacaine and levobupivacaine can also lead to this effect.

See also
 Chondritis
 Osteochondritis
 Relapsing polychondritis

References

External links

 Chondrolysis at Radiopedia

Rheumatology
Chondropathies